Histolysin (histolysin, Entamoeba histolytica cysteine proteinase, amebapain, Entamoeba histolytica cysteine protease, Entamoeba histolytica neutral thiol proteinase) is an enzyme. This enzyme catalyses the following chemical reaction

 Hydrolysis of proteins, including basement membrane collagen and azocasein. Preferential cleavage: Arg-Arg- in small molecule substrates including Z-Arg-Arg-!NHMec

This enzyme is present in the protozoan, Entamoeba histolytica.

References

External links 
 

EC 3.4.22